Liprin-alpha-4 is a protein that in humans is encoded by the PPFIA4 gene.

Interactions 
PPFIA4 has been shown to interact with:
 ERC2, 
 GIT1, and
 Nuclear receptor coactivator 2.

References

Further reading